Orlando Esteban Bayona (born November 25, 1983) is a Colombian footballer.

Career

College and Amateur
Bayona played his college soccer at the University of the Incarnate Word between 2006 and 2008, where he is ranked 38th all-time in the soccer program history with 38 points (16 goals, 6 assists). He was named UIW offensive player of the year in 2006.

After finishing college, Bayona signed with USL Premier Development League club Laredo Heat, who he played for from 2009 to 2011. As a member of the Laredo Heat Bayona was named to the All-Southern Conference Team.  At the conclusion of the 2010 season, Bayona was named Laredo Heat Offensive Player of the Year. In 2011, he was on the PDL's top 3 goal scorers.

Professional
In March, 2012 Bayona signed his first professional contract with North American Soccer League club San Antonio Scorpions. He later signed with BÍ/Bolungarvík in the Icelandic first division.

References

External links
 San Antonio profile

1983 births
Living people
Colombian footballers
Colombian expatriate footballers
Laredo Heat players
San Antonio Scorpions players
Expatriate soccer players in the United States
USL League Two players
North American Soccer League players
Association football forwards
Footballers from Bogotá